Margovula is a genus of sea snails, marine gastropod mollusks in the family Ovulidae.

Species
Species within the genus Margovula include:
Margovula anulata (Fehse, 2001)
Margovula bimaculata (A. Adams, 1854)
Margovula crawfordcatei Lorenz & Fehse, 2009
Margovula lacrima (Cate, 1973)
Margovula marginata (Sowerby, 1828)
Margovula pyriformis (Sowerby, 1828)
 Margovula schilderorum Cate, 1973 
Margovula somaliensis (Fehse, 2001)
Margovula tinctilis (Cate, 1973)
Margovula translineata (Cate, 1973)
Species broughtinto synonymy
 Margovula aboriginea C. N. Cate, 1973: synonym of Diminovula aboriginea (C. N. Cate, 1973)
 Margovula changi Ma, 1997: synonym of Diminovula margarita (G. B. Sowerby I, 1828)
 Margovula kosugei C. N. Cate, 1973: synonym of Diminovula kosugei (C. N. Cate, 1973)
 Margovula pyrulina (A. Adams, 1854): synonym of Pseudosimnia pyrulina (A. Adams, 1855)

References

External links
 redale, T. (1935). Australian cowries. The Australian Zoologist. 8(2): 96-135, pls 8-9 

Ovulidae